The Amateur Trapshooting Association (ATA) serves as the governing body for the sport of American style of trapshooting. The ATA was founded in 1900 and as the American Trapshooting Association.
Its first president was John Philip Sousa.

See also 
 List of shooting sports organizations

References

External links 
 

Organizations established in 1900